Epipaschia is a genus of snout moths. It was described by James Brackenridge Clemens in 1860.

Species
 Epipaschia mesoleucalis
 Epipaschia ochrotalis
 Epipaschia superatalis Clemens, 1860

References

Epipaschiinae
Pyralidae genera